Conwentzia is a genus of net-winged insects belonging to the family Coniopterygidae or dustywings. Conwentzia species are present in most of Europe.

These tiny insects, also known as waxwing lacewings or dustywing lacewings. They have only vestigial hindwings. Body and forewings are covered with whitish dust of waxy scales which the insect produces itself. Forewings are carried nearly side-by-side when at rest, like many other Neuroptera.

To distinguish various species, an accurate study of the genitals by microscope is usually necessary.

Species
 Conwentzia africana
 Conwentzia barretti
 Conwentzia californica
 Conwentzia capensis
 Conwentzia fraternalis
 Conwentzia inverta
 Conwentzia nietoi
 Conwentzia obscura
 Conwentzia orthotibia
 Conwentzia pineticola
 Conwentzia psociformis
 Conwentzia sabae
 Conwentzia sinica
 Conwentzia yunguiana

References 

 Oswald, J. D. (2007). Neuropterida Species of the World. Version 2.0.

External links
 Bug Guide
 Nature Spot

Coniopterygidae
Neuroptera genera
Neuroptera of Europe